CZT may stand for:

 Community Z Tools, a set of tools for the Z notation
 Cadmium zinc telluride, a semiconductor material
 Chirp_Z-transform, another name for Bluestein's FFT algorithm
 Changzhutan, Changsha-Zhuzhou-xiangTan City Cluster